In general relativity, the Carminati–McLenaghan invariants or CM scalars are a set of 16 scalar curvature invariants for the Riemann tensor.  This set is usually supplemented with at least two additional invariants.

Mathematical definition

The CM invariants consist of 6 real scalars plus 5 complex scalars, making a total of 16 invariants.  They are defined in terms of the Weyl tensor  and its right (or left) dual , the Ricci tensor , and the trace-free Ricci tensor

The real CM scalars are:
 (the trace of the Ricci tensor)

The complex CM scalars are:

 

The CM scalars have the following degrees:
 is linear,
 are quadratic,
 are cubic,
 are quartic,
 are quintic.
They can all be expressed directly in terms of the Ricci spinors and Weyl spinors, using Newman–Penrose formalism; see the link below.

Complete sets of invariants
In the case of spherically symmetric spacetimes or planar symmetric spacetimes, it is known that 

comprise a complete set of invariants for the Riemann tensor.  In the case of vacuum solutions, electrovacuum solutions and perfect fluid solutions, the CM scalars comprise a complete set.  Additional invariants may be required for more general spacetimes; determining the exact number (and possible syzygies among the various invariants) is an open problem.

See also
Curvature invariant, for more about curvature invariants in (semi)-Riemannian geometry in general
Curvature invariant (general relativity), for other curvature invariants which are useful in general relativity

References

External links
The GRTensor II website includes a manual with definitions and discussions of the CM scalars.
Implementation in the Maxima computer algebra system

Tensors in general relativity